John Keenan (born 19 December 1964, in Glasgow) is the bishop of the Diocese of Paisley in Scotland. His appointment by Pope Francis was announced on 8 February 2014.  He is the fifth Bishop of Paisley.

Early life and education

John Keenan, one of the five children of Joseph and Philomena Keenan, was born in Glasgow where he was baptised at St Joseph's Church, Cowcaddens. He was educated at St Gregory's Primary School in the Wyndford area of the city before going on to the Salesian Missionary College, Shrigley Hall near Macclesfield, Cheshire, England where he received his secondary education. In 1984 he matriculated at the University of Glasgow where he read law, graduating with First Class Honours, as Bachelor of Laws in 1988. From 1988 until 1995 he received his priestly formation at the Pontifical Scots College and the Pontifical Gregorian University in Rome, Italy, graduating as Bachelor of Theology with licentiate in philosophy.

Priesthood

John Keenan was ordained to the priesthood by Cardinal Thomas Winning on 9 July 1995. Thereafter he was appointed to the parish of Christ the King in King's Park, Glasgow where he served until 2000. From 1997 until 2000 he was also chaplain to Holyrood Secondary School in Glasgow. Between 1995 and 2005 he lectured in philosophy at Scotus College, Bearsden. In 2000 he was appointed chaplain to the Catholic students and staff of the University of Glasgow, a post he held until his episcopal ordination. A few months prior to his Episcopal Ordination he was appointed by Archbishop Tartaglia
to be parish priest of St Patrick's Church in the Anderston district of Glasgow and Vocations Director for the Archdiocese of Glasgow.

Episcopate

John Keenan was consecrated bishop in St Mirin's Cathedral, Paisley on 19 March 2014, the Feast of Saint Joseph by Archbishop Philip Tartaglia of Glasgow. The principal co-consecrating bishops were Archbishop Leo Cushley of St Andrews and Edinburgh and Bishop John Mone emeritus Bishop of Paisley. Bishop Keenan has taken as his episcopal motto the words Suscepit servum recordatus misericordiae (He protects his servant remembering his mercy) inspired by the Magnificat. John Keenan is vice-president of the Catholic Bishops Conference of Scotland.

References

1964 births
Clergy from Glasgow
Roman Catholic bishops of Paisley
Alumni of the University of Glasgow
Pontifical Gregorian University alumni
Living people
Scottish people of Irish descent
21st-century Roman Catholic bishops in Scotland
Scottish Roman Catholic bishops